William Shippen may refer to:
 William Shippen (MP) (1673–1743), English Member of Parliament
 William Shippen Sr. (1712–1801), American physician
 William Shippen Jr. (1738–1808), his son, American physician